Badibanga is a surname. Notable people with the surname include:

Beni Badibanga (born 1996), Belgian footballer, son of Samy
Samy Badibanga (born 1962), Congolese politician
Ziguy Badibanga (born 1991), Belgian footballer

Surnames of African origin